Czapla ("heron" in Polish) may refer to:

 Czapla, West Pomeranian Voivodeship, a village in north-western Poland
 Czapla (surname)
 RWD-14 Czapla
 SZD-10 Czapla

See also